Paracanthurus hepatus is a species of Indo-Pacific surgeonfish. A popular fish in marine aquaria, it is the only member of the genus Paracanthurus. A number of common names are attributed to the species, including regal tang, palette surgeonfish, blue tang (leading to confusion with the Atlantic species Acanthurus coeruleus), royal blue tang, hippo tang, blue hippo tang, flagtail surgeonfish, Pacific regal blue tang, and blue surgeonfish.

Description
Paracanthurus hepatus has a royal blue body, yellow tail, and black "palette" design. The lower body is yellow in the west-central Indian Ocean. This fish is rather flat, like a pancake, with a circular body shape, a pointed snout-like nose, and small scales. The blue tang has nine dorsal spines, 26–28 dorsal soft rays, three anal spines, and 24–26 anal soft yellow rays.

Ecology

Location 
The regal blue tang can be found throughout the Indo-Pacific. It is seen in the reefs of the Philippines, Indonesia, Japan, the Great Barrier Reef of Australia, New Caledonia, Samoa, East Africa, and Sri Lanka. A single specimen was photographed in 2015 in the Mediterranean Sea off Israel.
 
The regal blue tang is one of the most common and most popular marine aquarium fish all over the world. They live in pairs or small groups of 8 to 14 individuals. They can also be found near cauliflower corals on the seaweed side of coral reefs.

The regal blue tang is ranked LC (least concern) by the World Conservation Union (IUCN), but is of low vulnerability.

Diet
As a juvenile, its diet consists primarily of plankton. Adults are omnivorous and feed on plankton, but will also graze on algae. Spawning occurs during late afternoon and evening hours. This event is indicated by a change in color from a uniform dark blue to a pale blue. The fish is important for coral health as it eats algae that may otherwise choke it by overgrowth.

Life cycle
Males aggressively court female members of the school, leading to a quick upward spawning rush toward the surface of the water during which eggs and sperm are released. The eggs are pelagic, each containing a single droplet of oil for flotation. The fertilized eggs hatch in twenty-four hours, revealing small, translucent larvae with silvery abdomens and rudimentary caudal spines. Once opaque, the black "palette" pattern on juveniles do not fully connect until mature. These fish reach sexual maturity at 9–12 months of age.

Importance to humans
The regal blue tang is of minor commercial fisheries importance; however, it is a bait fish. The flesh has a strong odor and is not highly prized. This fish may cause ciguatera poisoning if consumed by humans. However, regal blue tangs are collected commercially for the aquarium trade. Handling the tang risks the chances of being badly cut by the caudal spine. These spines, on both sides of the caudal peduncle, are extended from the body when the fish is stressed. The quick, thrashing sideways motion of the tail can produce deep wounds that result in swelling and discoloration, posing a risk of infection. It is believed that some species of Acanthurus have venom glands while others do not. The spines are used only as a method of protection against aggressors. Two sharp spines stick out at the caudal peduncle—the area where the tail joins the rest of the body.

Conservation
The species is classified as Least concern by the IUCN, however, it is threatened by overexploitation (mostly for the aquarium trade) and destructive fishing practices. Since it is dependent on fragile coral reef habitats, habitat destruction also constitutes pressure in parts of its range. In an endeavor to mitigate the destruction of natural regal blue tang populations, efforts have been made to breed the species in captivity. It was successfully captive-bred for the first time in 2016, after a 6-year long effort by biologist Kevin Barden of Rising Tide Conservation.

In popular culture
In the 2003 Disney/Pixar film, Finding Nemo, one of the main characters, Dory (voiced by Ellen DeGeneres) is a regal blue tang suffering from short term memory loss. She and her parents, Jenny and Charlie (voiced by Diane Keaton and Eugene Levy), appear in the 2016 Disney/Pixar film sequel, Finding Dory.

The blue tang also appears within the Endless Ocean series, where it is often found within coral reefs.

References

External links
 
 

Acanthuridae
Fish of Palau
Monotypic marine fish genera
Taxa named by Pieter Bleeker
Taxa named by Carl Linnaeus
Fish described in 1766